Philip Piratin (15 May 1907 – 10 December 1995) was a member of the Communist Party of Great Britain (CPGB) and one of the four CPGB Members of Parliament during the first thirty years of its existence. (The others were Shapurji Saklatvala, Walton Newbold and Willie Gallacher.)

Political career
Piratin was the son of a small local tradesman and attended Davenant Foundation School. He became a Communist activist, anti-fascist and defender of tenants' rights, a leading member of the Stepney Tenants Defence League. Of Jewish origin, he was the leader of the opposition to Oswald Mosley's anti-semitism and his British Union of Fascists' marches through East London. Piratin was elected to Stepney Borough Council in 1937 and was Chairman of the borough's Communist Party. During World War II, he gained further notice by leading 100 people to shelter from the Blitz in the basement of the Savoy Hotel, to persuade the Government to open the London Underground stations to anyone sheltering from the bombing, a practice which the Government had previously ruled out, but which then became widespread.

Piratin was elected at the 1945 General Election as Member of Parliament (MP) for Mile End in Stepney, becoming one of the last two CPGB MPs. In Parliament, he worked with several left-wing Labour MPs, some of whom would be expelled by their party as crypto-communists and form the Labour Independent Group. He was defeated when he stood for re-election in 1950 in the new constituency of Stepney; his old seat of Mile End having been abolished due to boundary changes.

Until 1957, Piratin was the circulation manager of the communist newspaper The Daily Worker, but he left early that year, ostensibly over a matter of process. However, in 1991 he told Alison Macleod about his doubts at the time: "In 1956, Phil said, he drove to Oxford, to defend the Party line on Hungary at a meeting of undergraduates. He got as far as outside the hall, stopped – and drove home again. Phil remained in the Party, but he never again worked for it full time. Piratin later became a businessman."

Publications
Phil Piratin; Our Flag Stays Red, Thames, London (1948).

See also
List of British Jews

External links

  Three interviews with Phil Piratin about Communism in the East End

References

1907 births
1995 deaths
Councillors in Greater London
English communists
English Jews
Jewish socialists
Members of the Parliament of the United Kingdom for English constituencies
UK MPs 1945–1950
Communist Party of Great Britain MPs
Communist Party of Great Britain councillors
Communist Party of Great Britain members
Jewish British politicians